Daniel Stynes (born 29 August 1998) is an Australian professional footballer who plays as an attacking midfielder for Newcastle Jets. He made his senior debut for Perth Glory as an 18 year old against Heidelberg United on 1 August 2017 in the FFA cup. He made his starting professional debut for Perth Glory on 7 August 2018 in an FFA Cup match against Melbourne Victory.

Club career

Perth Glory
Stynes was a member of the youth team for 3 seasons where he won the Dylan Tombides young player of the year award as well as making his debut against Heidelberg in the FFA cup. Stynes also signed his first professional contract for the 2017/18 season however tore his hamstring a day after and didn't feature at all again that season. Stynes returned in his starting debut against Melbourne Victory however was forced off due to a challenge that ruled him out for most of the 2018/19 season.

Bentleigh Greens
In June 2019, Stynes joined Bentleigh Greens in the National Premier Leagues Victoria.

Back to Perth 
In November 2020, Stynes was selected as part of the 2020 Asian Champions League squad which played out the remaining games, which were originally postponed due the COVID-19 pandemic, in Qatar. His first goal for Glory came during a group stage game against Ulsan Hyundai, in which he was in the starting line-up.

References

External links

1998 births
Living people
Australian soccer players
Association football midfielders
Perth Glory FC players
Bentleigh Greens SC players
Newcastle Jets FC players
National Premier Leagues players
A-League Men players